The Department of Computer Science of the University of Bristol, is the computer science department of the University of Bristol and is based in the Merchant Venturers building on Woodland Road, close to Bristol city centre.  the department is home to 145 academic staff, researchers, and PhD students.

Research
Research in the department is organised around 10 research groups, which focus on cryptography, algorithms, Human–computer interaction (HCI), computer vision, artificial intelligence (AI), verification, computational neuroscience, cybersecurity, robotics, high-performance computing, and programming languages.

History

The Department of Computer Science was formally established around 1984. Its heads of department include
 Professor Mike Rogers (1984-1995)
 Professor David May (1995-2006)
 Professor Nigel Smart (2006-?)
 Professor Andrew Calway
 Professor Seth Bullock (2016-2020)
 Professor Christian Allen (2020-2021)
 Dr. Aisling O'Kane (2021-)

Notable faculty members
 the department employs fourteen Professors, shown below:

 Professor Awais Rashid
 Professor Dave Cliff
 Professor Peter Flach
 Professor Majid Mirmehdi
 Professor Seth Bullock
 Professor Kerstin Eder
 Professor Walterio Mayol-Cuevas
 Professor Simon McIntosh-Smith
 Professor Andrew Calway
 Professor Kirsten Cater
 Professor Ian Nabney
 Professor Chris Preist
 Professor Bogdan Warinschi
 Professor Dima Damen

References

University of Bristol
Bristol